"Hold My Hand" is a song by American singer Lady Gaga, released on May 3, 2022, through Interscope Records. It is the lead single to the soundtrack for the film Top Gun: Maverick (2022). The song was written and produced by Gaga and BloodPop as "a love letter to the world during and after a very hard time". Benjamin Rice received additional production credits. Musically, "Hold My Hand" is a "hopeful" arena rock track, featuring an anthemic chorus and an electric guitar.

"Hold My Hand" has charted at number one in Croatia, number five in Hungary and Switzerland, number six in Wallonia, and the top 30 in Australia, Canada, Flanders, Japan, the Netherlands, Singapore, Slovakia, Taiwan, and the United Kingdom. It was met with mixed to positive response. Critics noted its inspiration derived from 1980s power ballads, the decade in which the original Top Gun (1986) was released. "Hold My Hand" won the Satellite Award for Best Original Song and received various nominations at awards shows, including the Academy Award for Best Original Song, the Golden Globe Award for Best Original Song, the Grammy Award for Best Song Written for Visual Media, and the Critics' Choice Movie Award for Best Song.

An accompanying music video was directed by Joseph Kosinski, director of Top Gun: Maverick, and it was released on May 6, 2022. It featured Gaga performing the song in various settings, interspersed with scenes from the two Top Gun films. "Hold My Hand" served as the encore for Gaga's 2022 stadium tour, The Chromatica Ball. She also performed the song in a stripped-down rendition at the 95th Academy Awards.

Background and release
In April 2021, gossip website ShowBiz 411 reported that Lady Gaga would be involved with the soundtrack for Top Gun: Maverick. The rumor spread to other publications, including W magazine. In April 2022, Gaga began posting cryptic messages on Twitter, which fans interpreted as lyrics to the rumored song. She formally announced "Hold My Hand" and its release date on April 27, 2022. During the announcement, Gaga shared that she was working on the song for years, and "didn't even realize the multiple layers it spanned across the film's heart, my own psyche, and the nature of the world we've been living in" while writing it.

A preview of the song was released on April 30, followed by the release of the full track on May 3, as the first single from the soundtrack for Top Gun: Maverick. A week after the release, "Hold My Hand" received airplay through adult contemporary and contemporary hit radio stations in the US. The song was later also included on the Japan tour edition of Gaga’s sixth studio album Chromatica, as the final track.

Several other artists were considered to contribute music for the film. Tyler Joseph, frontman of American alternative-rock music duo Twenty One Pilots, revealed in an interview that, "...I was working with the music placement person for the new Top Gun on writing a new song for them ... and then I believe Tom Cruise came in and just fired everyone." Prior to the release of the film, Cruise described "Hold My Hand" as the missing piece in the film's puzzle: "Gaga came in with this song ... It became our score. It became the heartbeat of the film, what she did ... Emotionally, I was so concerned until I heard that piece. And I knew that that piece, what it does, how it married our story emotionally ... So that was a moment. That was a real moment for all of us."

In the film, "Hold My Hand" plays during a bar scene when Penny (played by Jennifer Connelly) and her daughter are having a conversation, and later the full song is played near the end of the film with Penny and Maverick (Tom Cruise) flying off into the sunset in his P-51 Mustang.

Music and lyrics
"Hold My Hand" was co-written by Gaga with the track's producer, BloodPop. Benjamin Rice received additional production credits. It has been described by music and film critics as a "hopeful, anthemic" arena rock power ballad and a torch song. Jazz Tangcay of Variety called "Hold My Hand" a "soaring rock tune with violins and guitar licks that harken back to the power ballads of the '80s." Its lyrics see Gaga reassuring someone that she will always be there for them "without question."

Lars Brandle of Billboard noted that the song has a close lineage to Berlin's "Take My Breath Away" and Kenny Loggins' "Danger Zone", two tracks from the soundtrack of the original Top Gun film. Music critics from other outlets compared "Hold My Hand" to songs such as "Open Arms" by Journey, "Alone" by Heart, and Gaga's own 2011 single, "The Edge of Glory".

The song was originally published in the key of G major and starts with G/D/C/G/D chord progression with three intro bars before the singer starts with the lyrics: "Hold my hand, everything will be okay/I heard from the heavens that clouds have been gray/Pull me close, wrap me in your aching arms".

Reception

Critical response
"Hold My Hand" received mixed to positive reviews from music critics. Robin Murray of Clash called the song "a triumph of bombast" which "finds Lady Gaga cutting loose as a vocalist". Variety Jazz Tangcay found the song a "catchy earworm" with a "strong guitar solo", and argued that it is "on track to being an Oscar frontrunner in the original song race." Nancy Tartaglione from Deadline Hollywood also believed "it's another in Gaga's and the Top Gun canon that could go all the way to the Oscars". Vulture, an online blog associated with New York Magazine opined that "Hold My Hand" is an "outlier in Gaga's catalogue" as "this is one of her only pop songs with zero subversive elements", while noting that "the song's sheer level of self-determination is quintessential Gaga. It feels like a sincere attempt to write the most inspiring end-credits ballad of all time." Screen Rant Benjamin Weiss highlighted Gaga's "soaring" vocals, noting the song "heavily relies on the performance of the singer rather than production or instrumentation." In his film review, Peter Travers of ABC News found "Hold My Hand" the "closest" Top Gun: Maverick "gets to passion", with "Lady Gaga belting her feels full out in an Oscar-ready new theme song".

Stephen Thompson of NPR felt, "Lady Gaga gives 'Hold My Hand' every ounce of the fists-plunged-heavenward, writhing-atop-a-piano-on-a-lonely-airstrip grandeur it requires, and then some. Lyrically, it doesn't add up to a whole lot — 'I know you're scared and your pain is imperfect / But don't you give up on yourself' — but damned if it doesn't pair effectively with images of planes whooshing ominously and rulebooks getting tossed into trash cans." Mikael Wood of Los Angeles Times listed "Hold My Hand" as one of the standout tracks of 2022, and wrote: "No, it can't hold a Bic lighter to 'Shallow' from A Star Is Born. But as experienced against the meta-blockbuster delirium of Top Gun: Maverick, Gaga's thunderous '80s-style power ballad achieves a kind of popcorn nirvana." For the Evening Standard Gemma Samways, the song is a sentimental ballad "so brilliantly overblown you simply can't imagine any other major pop artist pulling it off." Collider Ross Bonaime felt similarly, saying "it's hard to imagine anyone else being able to pull this song off. It's cheesy and over-the-top, but thanks to Lady Gaga, it works."

Stuart Heritage of The Guardian thought that the track is "bombastic and emotional, and includes everything you could possibly want from a Lady Gaga power ballad". However, Michael Cragg from the same outlet opined that "Hold My Hand" was "mildly underwhelming", "bloated and saggy". Alexa Camp of Slant Magazine argued that "for a song the artist claims she's been perfecting 'for years', 'Hold My Hand' struggles to take flight". USA Today Melissa Ruggieri called it "a middling ballad", while NME Nick Levine deemed it a "tepid song". The Dallas Observer Carly May Gravley found it a "forgettable" single.

Accolades 
{| class="wikitable plainrowheaders"
|-
! Year
! Organization
! Award
! Result
! Ref.
|-
! rowspan="4" scope="row"| 2022
| Hollywood Music in Media Awards
| Best Original Song – Feature Film
| 
| style="text-align:center;"| 
|-
| People's Choice Awards
| Song of 2022
| 
| style="text-align:center;"| 
|-
| RTHK International Pop Poll Awards
| Top Ten International Gold Songs
| 
| style="text-align:center;"| 
|-
| World Soundtrack Awards
| Best Original Song Written Directly for a Film
| 
| style="text-align:center;"| 
|-
! rowspan="13" scope="row"| 2023
| Academy Awards
| Best Original Song
| 
| style="text-align:center;"| 
|-
| Critics' Choice Awards
| Best Song
| 
| style="text-align:center;"| 
|-
| Georgia Film Critics Association
| Best Original Song
| 
| style="text-align:center;"| 
|-
| Golden Globe Awards
| Best Original Song – Motion Picture
| 
| style="text-align:center;"| 
|-
| Grammy Awards
| Best Song Written for Visual Media
| 
| style="text-align:center;"| 
|-
| Guild of Music Supervisors Awards
| Best Song Written and/or Recorded for a Film
| 
| style="text-align:center;"| 
|-
| Hollywood Critics Association
| Best Original Song
| 
| style="text-align:center;"| 
|-
| Houston Film Critics Society
| Best Original Song
| 
| style="text-align:center;"| 
|-
| Japan Gold Disc Awards
| Song of the Year by Download (Western)
| 
| style="text-align:center;"| 
|-
| Lumiere Awards
| Best Original Song
| 
| style="text-align:center;"| 
|-
| Satellite Awards
| Best Original Song
| 
| style="text-align:center;"| 
|-
| Society of Composers & Lyricists
| Outstanding Original Song for a Dramatic or Documentary Visual Media Production
| 
| style="text-align:center;"|

Chart performance
Due to being released on a Tuesday, in its first week "Hold My Hand" did not enter the United States' Billboard Hot 100, but entered at number 17 on the Bubbling Under Hot 100 based on three days of tracking. A week later it debuted at number 82 on the Billboard Hot 100. Following the theatrical release of Top Gun: Maverick, the song reached a new peak of number 49 in its fifth week on the chart. Additionally, the song peaked at number 19 on the Billboard Mainstream Top 40 chart, number 12 on the Billboard Adult Pop Airplay chart, and number nine on the Billboard Adult Contemporary chart. On the Billboard Global 200 chart, the song debuted at number 62 following its first full week of availability, and  reached a peak in the top 40 at number 37.

The song entered at number six on the Canadian Digital Song Sales chart with just three days of tracking. A week later the song debuted at number 38 on the Canadian Hot 100, marking her 25th top 40 entry on the chart. In its sixth week on the chart, the song reached a new peak of number 25. The song debuted in the top 40 in Australia on the ARIA Singles Chart, making its entry at number 36, becoming her 30th top 40 entry there. In Australia, the song peaked at number 29 in its eighth week on the chart. In New Zealand, the song debuted at number 33 on the Top 40 Singles Chart following the release of Top Gun: Maverick.

Throughout Europe, the single fared better. "Hold My Hand" entered the UK Singles Chart at number 51, before falling to number 60 the following week. In its fourth week on the chart, following the theatrical release of Top Gun: Maverick, the song climbed to a new peak position of number 24. It was the 22th best-selling song of 2022 in the UK.  The song debuted at number 63 on the Swiss Singles Top 75 chart in its first half week of release, but entered the top 20 the following week after a full week of availability, charting at number 13. In Switzerland, the song reached a peak of number five. On Belgium's Wallonian Ultratop 50 Singles chart, the song reached a peak of number six. In the Netherlands, the song debuted at number 35 on the Dutch Top 40 chart and at number 26 on the country's Single Tip chart, on the latter of which it later peaked at number one.

Music video
The accompanying music video was directed by Joseph Kosinski, director of Top Gun: Maverick, and it was released on May 6, 2022. It was partially shot in black and white. It pulls imagery from the 1986 Top Gun in nostalgic flashback form – at one point, the music video emotionally notes Tom Cruise as test pilot Maverick with Anthony Edwards' character, Nick "Goose" Bradshaw, holding him after the character tragically dies – as well as theatrical film edits from Top Gun: Maverick. The music video embodies Gaga in a theatrical performance, playing a grand piano on a military air-force runway and singing around an airplane hangar.

During the video, Gaga is wearing the original aviation bomber jacket that Cruise wore as Maverick in the original Top Gun film. When the song hits its climax, Gaga switches the tank-top underneath the aviator bomber jacket for a nude gown that explodes off the singer and into the wind. The dress was created by Ukrainian designer Lessja Verlingieri for her brand Lever Couture.

Live performances

"Hold My Hand" was performed on Gaga's 2022 stadium tour, The Chromatica Ball, as the encore. The performance was accompanied by "chunky guitars" and pyrotechnic effects, with Gaga dressed in latex and leather, and sporting a metallic claw. Some critics were disappointed by the choice of "Hold My Hand" as the final song of the show, saying it felt "like a " and "a little flat as the way to end the night", though others highlighted Gaga's "scorching vocal" during the song, and found it to be an "exceptional encore". The Guardian Michael Cragg, who was dismissive about the studio version of the song, thought that during the concert, "it just about makes sense", writing: "Taken out of the film's context and plonked into a roaring stadium it morphs into a song about Gaga's [favorite] topic – her relationship with a fanbase that has constantly acted as a healing salve. Now it's her chance to return the favour. 'Promise me, just hold my hand', she sings, that missing connection finally complete."

Gaga sang "Hold My Hand" at the 95th Academy Awards on March 12, 2023. She appeared on stage without makeup, in a plain black t-shirt and ripped jeans, and  began the performance by stating: "We need a lot of love to walk through this life, and we all need a hero sometimes. There's heroes all around us, in unassuming places, but you might find that you can be your own hero even if you feel broken inside." She was initially accompanied by merely a piano for the song, before drums and bass joined in after the first chorus. The performance was dedicated to the memory of the original Top Gun late director, Tony Scott. The Oscars' director Glenn Weiss explained that "Hold My Hand" is very meaningful for Gaga, and she aimed to give an unadorned rendition of the song, "and do it not as an 'Oscar performance', but as her." Thania Garcia of Variety felt "Hold My Hand" received a "surprisingly rootsy, rock-band production" and described it as "stripped-down, yet enormously effective". USA Today Melissa Ruggieri noted how Gaga "relied on her mega-vocals in the most affecting performance of the show."

Charts

Weekly charts

Year-end charts

Certifications

Release history

References

External links
 

2020s ballads
2022 singles
2022 songs
Interscope Records singles
Lady Gaga songs
Rock ballads
Songs from Top Gun
Song recordings produced by BloodPop
Song recordings produced by Lady Gaga
Songs written by BloodPop
Songs written by Lady Gaga
Songs written for films
Song recordings produced by Ben Rice (producer)